This is a list of rivers in the U.S. state of New Mexico  arranged by drainage basin, with respective tributaries indented under each larger stream's name.

East of the continental divide

Mississippi watershed
Mississippi River (LA, AR)
Arkansas River (AR, OK)
Canadian River
North Canadian River (OK)
Beaver River (commonly marked as North Canadian River)
Punta de Agua Creek (TX)
Rita Blanca Creek (TX)
Carrizo Creek (New Mexico/Texas)
Tramperos Creek
Ute Creek
La Cinta Creek
Conchas River
Mora River
Sapello River
Cimarron River
Vermejo River
Dry Cimarron River
Purgatoire River

Rio Grande watershed
Rio Grande
Costilla Creek
Pecos River
Delaware River
Black River
Rio Penasco
Rio Felix
Rio Hondo (Southern New Mexico)
Berrendo River
Rio Bonito
Rio Ruidoso
Arroyo del Macho
Gallo Arroyo
Taiban Creek
Pintada Arroyo
Gallinas River
Alamosa Creek
Rio Salado
Rio Puerco
Rio San Jose
Arroyo Chico
Jemez River
Santa Fe River
Pojoaque River
Rio Chupadero
Rio Chama
 Rio Ojo Caliente
Rio Vallecitos
 Rio Tusas
 Rio del Oso
 El Rito
 Rio Puerco
 Rio Gallina
 Rio Capulin
 Rio Cebolla
 Rio Nutrias
 Rio Brazos
 Rio Chamita
Embudo Creek
Rio Pueblo de Taos
Rio Hondo (Northern New Mexico)
Red River

Interior basin
Mimbres River

West of the continental divide

Colorado watershed
Colorado River (AZ, UT, CO)
Gila River
San Francisco River
Tularosa River
Little Colorado River (AZ)
Puerco River
Black Creek (Arizona)
Zuni River
Rio Nutria
Rio Pescado
San Juan River
Chaco River
La Plata River
Animas River
Los Pinos River
Navajo River

See also 
List of mountain ranges of New Mexico
List of valleys of New Mexico
List of rivers in the United States

References

External links
USGS Geographic Names Information Service
USGS Hydrologic Unit Map - State of New Mexico (1974)

New Mexico rivers
 
Rivers